On November 1, 1991, Head  of the All-National Congress of the Chechen People, Dzokhar Dudayev issued a Decree of Sovereignty of the Chechen Republic. Between 1991 and 2000 Chechnya was de facto an independent state.

Background

Government building storming
On 7 September 1991, the NCChP National Guard seized government buildings and the radio and television center of the Checheno-Ingush ASSR, an autonomous Soviet republic. The storming caused the death of the Soviet Communist Party chief for Grozny, Vitali Kutsenko, who was either thrown out of a window or fell trying to escape during a supreme soviet session, and effectively dissolved the government of the Chechen-Ingush ASSR.

Referendum
Prior to the inauguration of the decree was an independence referendum held on October 27, 1991, with a large majority (72%) of the populace voting and a majority approval (over 90% of voters, meaning at least about 64% of the populace approved independence). Although there were claims about the election that it was unfair or flawed. John B. Dunlop stated that there probably were some flaws in the election, he cites the observer, anthropologist Arutyunov (who stated that roughly 60-70% of the population of Chechnya supported independence at the time) it could nonetheless "be regarded as an expression of Chechen popular will". Ruslan Khasbulatov claimed that the elections were un-democratic.

The decree
President Dudayev issued a decree that states the sovereignty of the Chechen Republic, the decree reads as follows:

References

Chechen Republic of Ichkeria
Separatism in Russia
November 1991 events in Russia